John O. Colvin (born November 17, 1946 in Canton, Ohio) is an American lawyer who serves as a senior judge of the United States Tax Court.

Colvin received a Bachelor of Arts from the University of Missouri in 1968, and completed a Juris Doctor there in 1971. He earned a Master of Laws in taxation from the Georgetown University Law Center in 1978. During college and law school he was employed by a private firm, Niedner, Niedner, Nack and Bodeux, of St. Charles, Missouri, and also worked for a number of political figures, including Missouri Attorney General John C. Danforth and Missouri State Representative Richard C. Marshall, both in Jefferson City; and for Senator Mark O. Hatfield and Congressman Thomas B. Curtis, in Washington, D.C.

From 1975 to 1984, Colvin served as tax counsel to Senator Bob Packwood, and thereafter was counsel to the Senate Finance Committee for several years, and also served as an adjunct professor of law at Georgetown University Law Center, beginning in 1987.

On September 1, 1988, Colvin was appointed by President Ronald Reagan as judge of the United States Tax Court on September 1, 1988 for a term ending August 31, 2003. He was reappointed by President George W. Bush on August 12, 2004, for a term ending August 11, 2019. Colvin was elected chief judge of the U.S. Tax Court effective June 1, 2006, and reelected effective June 1, 2008 and June 1, 2010. He also served as interim chief judge from March 8 to August 6, 2013.

Other
Admitted to practice law in Missouri, 1971, and District of Columbia, 1974.
Office of the Chief Counsel, United States Coast Guard, Washington, D.C., 1971-75.
Officer, Tax Section, Federal Bar Association, since 1978.

References
 www.govpeople.org

Attribution
Material on this page was copied from the website of the United States Tax Court, which is published by a United States government agency, and is therefore in the public domain.

1946 births
Living people
20th-century American judges
21st-century American judges
Georgetown University Law Center alumni
Judges of the United States Tax Court
Lawyers from Canton, Ohio
United States Article I federal judges appointed by George W. Bush
United States Article I federal judges appointed by Ronald Reagan
University of Missouri alumni